Colette Peignot (October 8, 1903 – November 7, 1938) was a French writer and poet. She is most known by the pseudonym Laure, but also wrote under the self-chosen name Claude Araxe, derived from a phase in Virgil's Aeneid.

Life
Peignot was born into an old bourgeois family of intellectuals; her mother's side included academics such as Albert Lenoir, Alexandre Lenoir. Peignot was profoundly affected during her childhood by the deaths of her father, Georges Peignot, a famous French type design, and three uncles during World War I, by her failing health (tuberculosis nearly killed her at age 13), and by sexual abuse from a priest. Her writings are full of fury, improprieties, and suffering.

Highly implicated in the early communist movement, she used her life as a tool of emancipation. She spent the money she inherited from her father in supporting political journals and reviews such as Critique sociale. She was friends with and heavily involved many of the interwar French avant-garde writers and intellectuals, including philosopher Simone Weil, Michel Leiris, and Georges Bataille; she was also romantically involved with Boris Souvarine.

Like many others in the interwar period, Peignot rejected republicanism, fascism, Catholicism, and Stalinist Russia, supporting Trotsky instead. Motivated by her beliefs in Trotskyism, she learned Russian and visited the USSR, also joining Souvarine's anti-Stalinist group. She wrote for a number of publications including Le Travailleur communiste syndical et cooperatif and La Critique sociale.

At the end of her life, she was considered to be a muse for the French avant-garde of literature and politics and was at the center of Bataille's secret society Acéphale. She died at age 35 of tuberculosis. Her remains were interred at the cemetery in Fourqueux.

Legacy
Peignot's works were published posthumously by Leiris, against the will of her brother, Charles Peignot. They were therefore published under the name "Laure". Her nephew, the poet Jérôme Peignot (who thought of Colette as a “diagonal mother”), republished the manuscripts in 1971 and 1977, despite the same family's opposition.

Works 
 Laure: the Collected Writings translated by Jeanine Herman (City Lights, 1995)

References

Further reading

External links
 "Laure: The 'True Whore' as Muse", by Jason DeBoer

1903 births
1938 deaths
Analysands of Adrien Borel
20th-century French novelists
French women novelists
20th-century French women writers